Business casual is an ambiguously defined Western dress code that is generally considered casual wear but with smart (in the sense of "well dressed") components of a proper lounge suit from traditional informal wear, adopted for  white-collar workplaces. This interpretation typically including dress shirt and trousers, but worn with an odd-coloured blazer or a sports coat instead. Neck ties are optional in this category.

Acceptance of business casual in the United States was preceded by Casual Fridays which originated in California in the 1990s, in turn inspired by the Hawaiian 1960s casual custom of Aloha Friday. The designation of particular clothing pieces as "business casual" may be contentious.

Definition
There is no generally agreed definition of "business casual".  One definition of business casual states that it includes khaki pants, slacks, and skirts, as well as short-sleeved polo shirts  and long-sleeved shirts, but excludes tight or short skirts, T-shirts, and sweatshirts. Another source, an American university careers service, states that business casual consists of neutral colors more towards the dark shades of black, gray, navy, but can include white and off white, and reminds that the clothing should be pressed and have clean, crisp seams. The "Dress for Success" advice from the University of Toronto sums up business casual as "a classic, clean cut, and put together look where a full suit is not required," which means slacks, khakis, or skirts; blouses, polo shirts, or shirts with collar but no necktie; some sweaters; and closed-toe shoes. The Canadian university ends with the warning that "it is not clothing you would wear to a club or for athletic purposes.... Don’t let the word casual mislead you. You still need to look professional."

Another author wrote in the Financial Times that "Ordinarily business casual for guys seems fairly clear. It is a pair of chinos, a blazer and a good shirt, no tie." 

A writer wrote in a workwear Blog that "Business casual attire for also men consists of dress pants, dockers-type pants, khakis and a shirt. They also wear a golf-type shirt instead of a traditional shirt, and they wear sweaters or vests on top of the shirt. Women’s choose to wear pants or skirts with a top or blouses paired with a sweater."

A BBC article suggested that a "safe global standard" consists of "a button down shirt," "jackets or blazers, khaki or gray slacks, and leather shoes." It warned, however, that great variation exists between countries and regions within countries. A U.S. menswear retailer advises men to wear a collared shirt, chinos, navy blazer, and brown shoes, while making sure to look "clean and well-groomed."

A contributor to Forbes asked her Facebook friends to define business casual, and found a slightly more casual apparent consensus not forcibly including a jacket: "For men: trousers/khakis and a shirt with a collar. For women: trousers/knee-length skirt and a blouse or shirt with a collar. No jeans. No athletic wear." A response to that was "I disagree. No khakis." She states that "there’s a lack of consensus in what actually defines a business casual wardrobe. All most people know is they don’t want to see too much of a colleague’s body, including feet."

See also
 Dress code
 Western dress codes
 Casual wear
 Smart casual
 Casual Friday
 Workwear
 Sportswear

References

1990s fashion
Fashion aesthetics
Workwear
Lounge jackets
Casual wear